Ipsilon may refer to:

Ipsilon Networks, a defunct company
The Greek letter upsilon
The Latin letter Y
The Fedora Project's Ipsilon IdP

See also
 Upsilon (disambiguation)
 Ypsilon (disambiguation)